Anthony Crosby was an English artist, historian, and Barrister's Clerk in the 19th century. He is remembered for his notes and sketches of the River Fleet and its surrounding areas in London before it was covered and became a subterranean river. Though he had planned to publish these works in a book titled "Views of the River Fleet," it was never completed before his death in 1857. Nevertheless, his sketches and notes were later used in historical books and are currently housed in the Crosby Collection at the London Metropolitan Archives.

Crosby was also the Honorary Secretary for the Society for Promoting Practical Design and the author of correspondence to the British royal family on the behalf of Ann Maguire seeking settlement for a claimed secret marriage to the Duke of Gloucester and Edinburgh.

Biography

Crosby was born to Anthony and Eliza Crosby in 1792 and baptised at Saint Andrew, Holborn, London on 1st November 1792. His father was an attorney at the Court of King's Bench. Crosby married Sarah on 14th March 1824. They had a son, Horatio Byron (born 1824) and three daughters Elizabeth Marianne (1827), Ellena Levinia (1830) and Sarah Emma (1831). He died in St Pancras on 17th November 1857 of pneumonia.

Career

In 1824, Crosby was a student of law at Mitre Court, Inner Temple, London. Later, Crosby worked as a Barrister's Clerk at 3 Stoney Lane, Lincoln's Inn Fields, London in the office of  John Miller. His professional position allowed him to interact with influential clients, and he sought to utilize some of these relationships for his own advantage.

Views of the River Fleet

Crosby first tried to raise funds for a book, “Views of the River Fleet”, in June 1832 to be printed by T Richardson of 245 High Holborn, London through subscriptions of one guinea. The books would consist of twenty engravings and include “historical notices from the earliest periods to the present time”.
 
Further sketches and water colours were added in the period up to 1844. Crosby, utilizing his experience as a solicitor, was known to gather statements from locals knowledgeable about the transformations of the River Fleet and its surroundings over their lifetimes. He utilized these statements to produce sketches of what the river and its surrounding buildings might have looked like in the past. Crosby died in 1857 and there is no evidence the work was ever published in his lifetime.

The sketches and notes were sold at auction by Puttick and Simpson of Leicester Square on the 19th July 1862 (lot 1718). They sold for £7 and 7 shillings. By 1885 the drawings were housed at the Guildhall Library, London. In 1888 his drawings were used in a publication “The Fleet: its river, prison, and marriages” by author and historian John Ashton.

The sketches are currently held in the Crosby Collection in the London Picture Archive at the London Metropolitan Archives. The archive has been used extensively by researchers, historians and publishers to provide images and contemporary descriptions of the 19th century River Fleet during the period where it was undergoing significant change from a free flowing natural river to a subterranean controlled water course as a result of the population expansion of the City of London.

Additionally, a dossier of correspondence, notes and other papers relating to the project are held at the Getty Research Institute in Los Angeles, California.

The Society for Promoting Practical Design

Crosby was an inaugural member of The Society for Promoting Practical Design which was established in London 1838. He was elected to the post of Honorary Secretary in 1839. The purpose of the society was "promoting practical design and diffusing a knowledge and love of arts among the people" by providing public education in drawing and design. The society created a number of art schools, including one at Savile House, Leicester Square. In 1839 Crosby held meetings with Board of Trade to promote government establishment for schools of design. The society was instrumental in the establishment of schools of design across the country and the teaching of drawing classes in primary schools.

Ann Maguire and The Duke of Gloucester

Ann Maguire was a lady who claimed to have had secret marriage to Prince William Frederick, Duke of Gloucester and Edinburgh in 1809 and believed she was entitled to a settlement of £2000 per year. Crosby wrote multiple letters to the royal family and their representatives after the death of the Duke in an attempt to settle Ann Maguire’s claim

References 

Engravers
English watercolourists
Painters from London

1792 births
1857 deaths